Artist Growth is a cloud-based touring and music business management application. Numerous artist managers, tour managers, and musicians use Artist Growth to boost team collaboration, simplify event logistics, track finances, automate ticket requests, quickly find files, and consolidate data. Customers of Artist Growth include artists such as Jason Aldean, Tiësto and Luke Combs, artist management companies such as Red Light and Vector, and major record labels.

History 
Artist Growth was founded by Matt Urmy and Jonathan Sexton in 2011. A prototype of their platform was launched in 2012, with a desktop version arriving in 2013.

In May 2018, Pinnacle Financial Partners announced taking a stake in Artist Growth in an effort to further expand its music, entertainment and sports business.

Software
The Artist Growth software platform is a tour management and live event support application. The software connects the artist and artist tour production team with the artist manager, talent agent, business manager, record label and third party tour service providers.

The key product feature sets include:
 Tour Management: artist managers, tour managers and production crews use Artist Growth software to run the operations of a tour through online collaboration across the entire tour team including third party service providers
 Roster Management: artist managers, business managers, booking agents and record label teams are able to share a roster-wide 360-view of all their artists' tour events, bookings and financials. These teams are also able to interface with individual artists' tour teams in planning and running a tour.
 Tour Financials: Artists and their business managers are able to track all revenue and costs associated with a tour. Artist Growth's integrations with booking agencies provide real-time revenue information. Tour managers are also able to report expenses on the road in real-time. Artist managers and financial accountants are able to view roster-wide financials.

The Artist Growth platform includes electronic integrations with other related software applications. Artist Growth's API brings interoperability to the entertainment industry, allowing artists and their management teams to receive data directly from partners such as talent agencies, promoters, Songkick, and Bandsintown. Users can also submit set lists to BMI via Artist Growth's app in order to collect compensation for performance royalties. In 2018, Artist Growth integrated with music tour booking agency, Rising Star Travel, to streamline tour scheduling.

The software today is available on iOS, Android, and web.

Artist Growth Finance 
In 2018, Artist Growth introduced a service labelled AG Finance whereby artists can apply for and receive capital to fund their touring business. AG Finance is delivered in partnership with the Music, Sports and Entertainment division of Pinnacle Financial Partners. The first AG Finance offering was announced in August 2018 where artists may apply and receive tour advance loans underwritten against their booked tour guarantees. The offering is primarily aimed at artist management companies with emerging artists in need of growth funding.

Awards
Artist Growth won the title of Best Music App by MTV's O Music Awards and was named Gizmodo's App of the Day in 2012.

References

External links
 

Calendaring software
Cloud applications